Rue is a railway station serving the town Rue, Somme department, northern France. The station is served by regional trains to Boulogne and Amiens.

References

Railway stations in Somme (department)
Railway stations in France opened in 1847